Big Life is the fourth studio album by Night Ranger, released in 1987.  It featured the single "The Secret of My Success", which was written for the 1987 film of the same name starring Michael J. Fox.  The single flopped, stalling outside the Top 40, peaking at No. 64.  It was a top twenty hit on the Mainstream Rock Chart though, hitting number 12 and was one of the most played videos in the spring of 1987 on MTV.  "Hearts Away" was the second single/video and peaked at No. 90 on the Hot 100 chart.  The third single/video, "Color of Your Smile" failed to chart in the U.S. at all.

This album would be the last to feature soon-to-depart original keyboardist Alan Fitzgerald until his return to the band a decade later for the Neverland album.

Track listing

Personnel
Night Ranger
Jack Blades – bass, lead and backing vocals
Brad Gillis – guitars, backing vocals
Jeff Watson – guitars
Alan Fitzgerald – keyboards
Kelly Keagy – drums, percussion, lead and backing vocals

Additional musicians
David Foster – additional keyboards on "The Secret of My Success"
Kevin Chalfant – additional backing vocals
Bill Champlin – additional backing vocals on "The Secret of My Success"

Production
Kevin Elson – producer, engineer, mixing
David Foster - producer/arranger on "Secret of My Success"
Wally Buck – engineer
Rick Hulbrook, Tom Size – additional engineering on "The Secret of My Success"
David Thoener – mixing
Frank Pekoc – mixing assistant

Charts

Album

Singles

Certifications

References

Night Ranger albums
1987 albums
MCA Records albums
Albums produced by Kevin Elson